William Crowhurst (24 October 1849 – 4 July 1915) was an English cricketer. He was a right-arm fast bowler who played one first-class cricket match for Kent County Cricket Club in 1877.

Crowhurst was born at Chislehurst in Kent in 1849. He made his only first-class appearance for Kent against Nottinghamshire in June 1877 at Canterbury. He died in St Mary Cray in 1915 aged 65.

References

External links

1849 births
1915 deaths
English cricketers
Kent cricketers
People from Chislehurst